Dirk Vollmar (born 4 April 1972) is a German former footballer.

External links

1972 births
Living people
German footballers
Association football forwards
Chemnitzer FC players
SC Paderborn 07 players
S.S. Juve Stabia players
Kickers Offenbach players
SV Wehen Wiesbaden players
Berliner FC Dynamo players
Berliner FC Dynamo managers
2. Bundesliga players
Place of birth missing (living people)
German football managers